Qareh Qabaq may refer to:
 Qareh Qabaq-e Olya
 Qareh Qabaq-e Sofla